The 1867 Northern Division by-election was a by-election to the New Zealand House of Representatives, during the term of the 4th Parliament on 1 July. The Northern Division electorate was a mostly rural electorate in the northern Auckland region.

The by-election was triggered by the resignation of Thomas Henderson. The nomination meeting was held on 24 June at the pilot station in Devonport (Flagstaff) on the North Shore. Henry Balneavis was the returning officer. Captain Isaac Cooper (a member of the Auckland Provincial Council) and Thomas Macfarlane were the candidates put forward. Macfarlane had prominent backers, with Patrick Dignan (member of the house of representatives) and David Sheehan (member of the provincial council) proposing and seconding the nomination. Captain Cooper was nominated by Captain Gladwyn Wynyard (the son of Auckland's first Superintendent, Robert Wynyard) and seconded by Philip Callan (a landowner, builder and publican on the North Shore). Macfarlane was Henderson's business partner. A show of hands was thirteen to six in favour of Macfarlane, with Cooper demanding a poll. The polling date was set for 1 July.

The following polling places were used:
 Pilot Station at Flagstaff, North Shore
 Little Muddy Creek at John McPike's residence
 Henderson's Mill at the locality of the same name
 Stokes' Point at Mr Reed's residence
 Weiti at Mr Lloyd's barn
 Mahurangi at the Public Hall
 Mahurangi at the Old Survey Station
 Waiwera at the post office
 Matakana at Mr Munro's store
 Helensville / Kaipara at the Old Court House
 Pitoitoi / Riverhead at Mr Keogh's house

The by-election was held on 1 July:

Macfarlane had very strong support at the principal polling station on the North Shore, with 124 votes to 29. Due to the rural nature of the electorate, it took a few more days for all the results to come in and the final result was released on 6 July. Macfarlane won by a large margin, similar to the margin achieved at the principal polling place, and was declared elected.

References

1867 elections in New Zealand